The following Confederate Army units and commanders fought in the Battle of Perryville of the American Civil War. The Union order of battle is listed separately.

Abbreviations used

Military rank
 Gen = General
 MG = Major General
 BG = Brigadier General
 Col = Colonel
 Ltc = Lieutenant Colonel
 Maj = Major
 Cpt = Captain
 Lt = 1st Lieutenant
 2Lt = 2nd Lieutenant

Artillery
 3" R = 3 inch caliber ordnance rifle
 How = Howitzer
 Nap = M1857 Napoleon gun
 pdr = pound (projectile weight)
 R = Rifled gun
 SB = Smoothbore gun

Other
 w = wounded
 mw = mortally wounded
 k = killed

Army of the Mississippi
16,000 men, 56 guns (k-532, w-2652, m-236 = 3,420)

Gen Braxton Bragg, Commanding

Escort:
 3rd Tennessee Cavalry (4 companies): Cpt W. C. Bacot
k-1, w-0, m-0 = 1
 13th Battalion Tennessee Cavalry, Company I: Cpt William W. Lillard

Right Wing
7,000 men, 16 guns (k-306, w-1153, m-87 = 1,546)

MG Leonidas Polk

Escort:
 Orleans Light Horse Company: Cpt Leeds Greenleaf

Left Wing
9,000 men, 40 guns (k-225, w-1499, m-149 = 1,873)

MG William Joseph Hardee

Escort:
 Raum's Cavalry Company (Mississippi): Cpt William Cyrus Rippey Raum

See also

 Kentucky in the American Civil War

Notes

References
 Holman, Kurt. Perryville Order of Battle: Forces Present at Perryville, October 8, 1862 (Revised July 1, 2012) unpublished paper, Perryville Battlefield State Historic Site.
 Noe, Kenneth W., Perryville: This Grand Havoc of Battle (Lexington, KY: University Press of Kentucky), 2001. 

American Civil War orders of battle